Love Is a Battlefield is a four-track EP from Japanese punk rock band, Hi-Standard. It was released on American label, Fat Wreck Chords, in July 2001.

Track listing
All songs written by Hi-Standard, except #2 written by Toshiharu Minorikawa and #4 written by George David Weiss, Hugo Peretti and Luigi Creatore.
"This is Love" – 1:19
"My First Kiss" – 3:11
"Catch a Wave" – 1:02
"Can't Help Falling in Love" – 2:44

Personnel
 Akihiro Nanba – vocals, bass
 Ken Yokoyama – guitar, vocals
 Akira Tsuneoka – drums
 Produced by Hi-Standard
 Engineered by Osamu Seino
 Mixed by Ryan Greene

References

External links
Fat Wreck Chords EP page

2001 EPs
Hi-Standard albums
Fat Wreck Chords EPs